= The European Lawyer =

Independent monthly business magazine and website

The European Lawyer was an independent monthly business magazine and website covering the legal profession in Europe. The magazine was launched in 2000. It was acquired in 2009 by Futurelex and published its 100th edition in 2010. The magazine covered news, features and analysis of the legal community. In 2011 The European Lawyer Reference Series was sold by Futurelex to Thomson Reuters. In 2012 The European Lawyer magazine became part of The Global Legal Post, which is also owned by Futurelex.

Patrick Wilkins was the editor-in-chief and the publisher of the magazine between its start in 2000 to 2009. In 2004 The European Lawyer also began publishing a series of legal reference books.
